The 2012 FIA WTCC Race of Austria was the sixth round of the 2012 World Touring Car Championship season and the inaugural running of the FIA WTCC Race of Austria. It was held on May 20, 2012 at the Salzburgring, east of Salzburg in Austria. The first race was won by Robert Huff for Chevrolet and the second race was won by Stefano D'Aste for Wiechers-Sport.

Background
Yvan Muller came into the event leading the championship 23 points clear of Alain Menu, who was in turn seven points ahead of Robert Huff. Gabriele Tarquini was the leading non-Chevrolet driver, 53 points behind Huff in the standings. Pepe Oriola was leading the Yokohama Independents' Trophy.

Report

Free Practice
Alain Menu led a Chevrolet 1-2-3 in the opening practice session, with Tom Coronel for ROAL Motorsport fourth quickest.

Menu set the pace once again in the second practice session, with Muller and Huff once again making it a 1-2-3 for Chevrolet. Pasquale di Sabatino surprised by finishing fourth fastest for bamboo-engineering.

Qualifying
Huff took pole position ahead of his Chevrolet teammates. Tom Chilton and Franz Engstler made contact in Q1, with BMW of Engstler spinning into the gravel and bringing the red flag out. Tarquini was the fastest non-Chevrolet driver and Alex MacDowall was the fastest independent. Aleksei Dudukalo would take pole position for the reversed grid race. Chilton received a five-place grid penalty for his collision with Engstler.

Warm-Up
Four Chevrolets finished morning warm-up at the top of the times, with Muller setting a time faster than Huff's pole position time. Muller finished the session on top ahead of Menu, Huff and MacDowall.

Race One
At a circuit where slipstreaming is important, Muller trailed Huff for the whole race to benefit from the tow. Further back, Special Tuning Racing's Darryl O'Young and Engstler Motorsport's Charles Ng tangled, with O'Young requiring attention at the circuit medical centre which would render him unable to start the second race. Huff took his 20th WTCC win ahead of Muller and Menu, Tarquini finished as best of the rest in fourth. MacDowall was the winning independent.

Race Two
Dudukalo started on pole position for a race which would be known for its multiple tyre issues. Both Dudukalo and his Lukoil Racing Team teammate Tarquini had to pit for fresh rubber due to punctures and Tiago Monteiro retired following a left-front puncture. After this, the three Chevrolets led until Menu went into the gravel on lap eight with a puncture. Shortly after, race one independent winner MacDowall also had a puncture and stopped in the gravel next to Menu's stranded car. The remaining Chevrolets of Muller and Huff comfortably led the BMW pair of Coronel and D'Aste until the final lap when Muller went off at turn 10 with a puncture and Huff suffered a puncture at the final corner. Coronel tried to go up the inside of Huff without success, allowing D'Aste to overtake the pair of them and take the win. Huff held off Coronel despite his puncture to take second.

Results

Qualifying

Bold denotes Pole position for second race.

Race 1

Bold denotes Fastest lap.

Race 2

Bold denotes Fastest lap.

Standings after the round

Drivers' Championship standings

Yokohama Independents' Trophy standings

Manufacturers' Championship standings

 Note: Only the top five positions are included for both sets of drivers' standings.

References

External links 

Austria
Race of Austria
Motorsport competitions in Austria